Cinematic Titanic was a project by Mystery Science Theater 3000 (MST3K) creator and original host, Joel Hodgson.
The project involved "riffing" B-movies, in a manner similar to that of MST3K.
Joining Hodgson were some of the original MST3K cast, as well as some cast members who joined later in the show's run. These included Trace Beaulieu, J. Elvis Weinstein, Frank Conniff and Mary Jo Pehl.
It was first performed live on December 7, 2007 and first aired on December 22, 2007.

On February 16, 2013, it was announced that the touring portion of Cinematic Titanic was going on an indefinite hiatus. According to an email sent out to members of the site, due to "5 people living in 5 different cities with different lives and projects, it has become increasingly difficult to coordinate our schedules and give Cinematic Titanic the attention it requires to keep growing as a creative enterprise and a business."  The final tour began on September 23, 2013.

Description 

Like Mystery Science Theater 3000, the series used black silhouettes of the riffers placed over the films, but in the case of Cinematic Titanic they sit on both sides of the screen rather than just on the lower right.
Visual gags are frequent (such as Beaulieu's use of a cherry picker in The Oozing Skull), and there are two or three host segments per episode, all performed in silhouette.

Plot 
The actors essentially play themselves as they participate in an experiment for some unknown (possibly shadowy) corporation or military force.  The story currently provided to the cast is that there is a tear in the "electron scaffolding" that threatens all digital media in the world.  Their experience doing MST3K is key to the organization's plans.  The riffing for each film is recorded to a "nanotated disc" and inserted into a "Time Tube" by Hodgson that descends into the frame at the end of every episode.  The unknown organization is very firm on keeping the cast focused on their duties, providing no time frame for completion and requiring them to stay within the facilities at all times.  They apparently have massive resources and an autonomous military force, which they use to keep the cast in line.  The cast is inquisitive of the true purpose of the experiments but have no major problems as, aside from having to watch bad movies, they are well-treated.

When the cast switched to performing for live audiences, the "corporation" premise was abandoned.

Relation to RiffTrax
When asked about potential collaborations with those involved in RiffTrax, Hodgson told New York magazine, "I don't know. I think those guys—Bill, Kevin and Mike—are really talented, obviously. I think anything’s possible, but I thought it might get confusing to try to merge them together or do crossover projects. I would never rule it out because it's all kind of the same universe. But RiffTrax, the idea of riffing on topical movies, is a different thing. And I like that the movie-riffing universe got bigger when they decided to do that, but we just do weird movies you've never seen before."

Studio / "Live" DVDs

In a question and answer session at the Tivoli Theatre in St. Louis, Missouri, it was announced that Cinematic Titanic would begin to release recordings from their live shows as "Live" DVDs in an effort to bring the energy of their on stage antics into people's living rooms and further promote the stage show.  When asked if this meant the demise of the studio produced DVDs, J. Elvis Weinstein said, "No, studio releases will return at some point in the future."  The first of these "Live" DVDs to be released was East Meets Watts, which was recorded in front of a live audience during one of the group's performances in Los Angeles.

Releases

Release history 
The first live performance was a private show for employees of Industrial Light & Magic on December 7, 2007.
After the live show, the cast reworked some jokes, delaying the original December 10 release date. The first episode of Cinematic Titanic was released on DVD to the public at midnight on December 21, via the download-to-burn company EZTakes. According to the Cinematic Titanic website, due to rights issues, the episode was not available for download until April 2, 2008.

Both the private show and the first release feature the B-movie Brain of Blood.
One of the original film's producers, concerned that creating multiple versions of the film could create marketplace confusion, requested that Cinematic Titanic'''s version have a different name. To alleviate his concerns, Cinematic Titanic retitled their release The Oozing Skull''.

It was also available on Hulu.

In March 2013, Cinematic Titanic sold the last of their on-hand DVD stock and ceased pressing their own discs.  From then on all releases were either in digital format, or through Amazon.com's print-on-demand service.

In May 2017, Shout! Factory released a Complete Series set, featuring all twelve episodes.

Release list 
Releases have been available to purchase as a physical DVD, and also as a download and burned DVD version.

List of live shows 

The following is an incomplete list of live performances by Cinematic Titanic.

See also 
 The Film Crew

References

External links 
 Official Youtube
 MST3K.info for Cinematic Titanic
 Interview with Joel Hodgson at IFC.com
 Interview at StarWars.com
 Review of Cinematic Titanic and its first episode
 DVD Talk discusses the first Cinematic Titanic episode
 Official playlist on ShoutFactoryTV

Mystery Science Theater 3000
American comedy troupes
2000s in comedy